Grampian Police Pipe Band is a Grade 2 pipe band associated with Grampian Police.

History
The band was formed as Aberdeen City Police Pipe Band in 1907, wearing the Hunting Gordon tartan. In 1965 a new uniform was introduced with the Black Stewart tartan.

The merger of police forces in the north of Scotland to create Grampian police resulted in the present name of the band being adopted.

Th band was promoted to Grade 1 for the start of the 1995 season, until it moved back to Grade 2 in 2005. For the 2012 season, the band returned to Grade 1, having changed both its pipe major and drum sergeant.  It placed 16th overall in the 2012 World Pipe Band Championships.

Events
The band plays at highland games and RSPBA competitions as well as police and community events. In 1990, the band played for the Queen Mother to celebrate her 90th birthday.

Membership
The band is open to both civilians and members of the police force. It currently has around 0 members.

Discography 

 The Bluebells of Scotland, Flower of Scotland (1995) 
 The Pipes & Drums of Scotland (2005) 
 Police Pipe Bands of Scotland (2010) 
 Best of Scottish Pipes and Drums (2010) 
 Marches Ecossaises (2011)

References

Grade 1 pipe bands
Pipe band associations
Scottish pipe bands
Grampian
Police bands